The 45th Yasar Dogu Tournament 2017, was a wrestling event held in Istanbul, Turkey between 10 and 12 July 2017.

This international tournament includes competition in both men's and women's freestyle wrestling. This ranking tourment was held in honor of the two time Olympic Champion, Yaşar Doğu.

Medal overview

Medal table

Men's freestyle

Women's freestyle

Participating nations

See also
2020 Yasar Dogu Tournament
2019 Yasar Dogu Tournament
2018 Yasar Dogu Tournament
2016 Yasar Dogu Tournament
2015 Yasar Dogu Tournament
2014 Yasar Dogu Tournament
2013 Yasar Dogu Tournament
2012 Yasar Dogu Tournament
2011 Yasar Dogu Tournament

References 

Yasar Dogu 2017
2017 in sport wrestling
March 2017 sports events in Turkey
Sports competitions in Istanbul
Yaşar Doğu Tournament
International wrestling competitions hosted by Turkey